is a Japanese football player who plays for SC Sagamihara.

National team career
In October 2009, Tada was elected Japan U-17 national team for 2009 U-17 World Cup, but he did not play in the match.

Club statistics
Updated to 2 January 2022.

1Includes Emperor's Cup.
2Includes J. League Cup.

References

External links

Profile at Tochigi SC
Profile at Akita

1992 births
Living people
Association football people from Osaka Prefecture
Japanese footballers
J1 League players
J2 League players
J3 League players
Cerezo Osaka players
Oita Trinita players
Thespakusatsu Gunma players
AC Nagano Parceiro players
Tochigi SC players
Blaublitz Akita players
SC Sagamihara players
Association football defenders